David Miles Hogg (born April 12, 2000) is an American gun control activist. He rose to prominence during the 2018 United States gun violence protests as a student survivor of the Stoneman Douglas High School shooting, helping lead several high-profile protests, marches, and boycotts, including the boycott of The Ingraham Angle. He has also been a target and scapegoat of several conspiracy theories.

With his sister Lauren Hogg, he wrote #NeverAgain: A New Generation Draws the Line, a book that made The New York Times Best Seller list. They pledged to donate to charity all income from the book. , Hogg is a student at Harvard University.

Hogg was included in Time magazine's 100 Most Influential People of 2018. He is the co-founder of Good Pillow, a pillow manufacturing company.

Early life and education 
Before attending Marjory Stoneman Douglas High School, Hogg lived in Los Angeles, California. He is the son of Kevin Hogg, a former agent of the Federal Bureau of Investigation. His mother is Rebecca Boldrick, born in San Diego County, California and a teacher for Broward County Public Schools in Broward County, Florida.

Hogg chose to attend Stoneman Douglas because it offered television production classes. He was a Teenlink reporter for the Sun Sentinel. He graduated on June 3, 2018. Hogg has dyslexia, attention deficit hyperactivity disorder, and post-traumatic stress disorder.

Hogg had been accepted to several universities, but decided to take a year off before starting college to work on the 2018 mid-term elections. In December 2018, he announced that he had been accepted by Harvard University and started in the fall of 2019.

After Hogg's sister Lauren Hogg graduated from Stoneman Douglas in 2021, he and his family relocated to Washington, D.C.

Stoneman Douglas High School shooting 

On February 14, 2018, Hogg was a senior at Stoneman Douglas and on campus when a 19-year-old former student of the school entered Building 12 and started shooting with a semi-automatic rifle. Hogg, who was in his AP environmental science class, told the teacher that the repeated "pop" sounds the class heard sounded like gunshots. When the fire alarm went off, Hogg and other students made an attempt to exit the building, but a janitor instructed the students to go back into the classroom. Hogg credits the janitor for saving them, as the group of students were inadvertently heading towards the shooter. A culinary arts teacher pulled Hogg and others inside her classroom and they hid in a closet.

Hogg checked social media and discovered that the shooting was occurring at his high school. He used his cell phone to record the scene in real time, to interview the other students hiding in the closet, and to leave a record in the event that they did not survive the shooting. Hogg's sister, Lauren Hogg, who was a freshman student at the time, corresponded with her brother via text message while the shooting was taking place. After about an hour, SWAT team police officers came into the classroom and escorted them out. Hogg reunited with his sister and father later that day.

Gun control advocacy

Protests

After the school shooting, Hogg emerged as a leader in the 2018 United States gun violence protests. Along with Alfonso Calderon, Sarah Chadwick, X González, Cameron Kasky and other students, he turned to the media to talk about their role as survivors in the shooting and voice his opinion on gun control and gun violence. He called on elected officials to pass gun control measures and has been a vocal critic of officials who take donations from the NRA, and he has been urging them to compromise on legislation to save lives.

Hogg joined the social media movement and student-led gun control advocacy group Never Again MSD shortly after its formation. Hogg flew to Los Angeles on February 21, 2018, to be on The Dr. Phil Show, along with his sister, to discuss the shooting. There, they met with survivors of the Columbine High School massacre. Hogg, along with González, blamed the National Rifle Association and the politicians to which they donate as being complicit in school shootings. He declined to go to the White House on February 21 to meet with President Donald Trump, saying that he had to be in Tallahassee, and that Trump could come to Parkland if he wanted to talk.

Reactions by politicians
When Republican candidate Leslie Gibson, who was running unopposed for the Maine House of Representatives, described González as a "skinhead lesbian", and also insulted Hogg as a "bald-faced liar", Hogg called for somebody to challenge the Republican; Eryn Gilchrist, who was "horrified and embarrassed" by Gibson's comment, decided to run as a Democrat to challenge Gibson for the position, as did Republican former State Senator Thomas Martin, Jr., who said Gibson's remarks did not represent the Maine Republican Party and that he planned to contact the survivors to commend their courage. Gibson dropped out of the race in response to public reaction critical of his comments.

Following the 2021 storming of the United States Capitol, David Hogg tweeted, "They can put up all the fencing around the capitol the real threats of @mtgreenee and @laurenboebert will still be inside until @GOPLeader takes a stand." Congresswoman Lauren Boebert (R-CO) retorted, "Give your keyboard a rest, child." A video of Congresswoman Marjorie Taylor Greene (R-GA) harassing Hogg in 2019 went viral in January 2021.

Recognition

Hogg was featured on the cover of an April 2018 edition of Time, along with fellow activists Alex Wind, Jaclyn Corin, González, and Kasky.

2nd Amendment views

Hogg states that he is a supporter of the Second Amendment and supports NRA members' right to own guns legally, saying in 2018, "We're calling out the NRA a lot and 99.9 percent of the people that are in the NRA are responsible, safe gun owners and I respect them for that, joining an organization that wants to support safe gun ownership is excellent."

In an interview with Fox News, Hogg said he was for reasonable gun control such as regulations that prohibit those with mental illnesses from acquiring guns.

On February 26, 2023, Hogg stated on Twitter that the individual "has no right to a gun", but rather the Second Amendment is "about a states right to have what is today the national guard. The modern interpretation of 2A is a ridiculous fraud pushed for decades by the gun lobby." He also called for the Protection of Lawful Commerce in Arms Act (PLCAA) to be repealed, and criticized the NYSRPA v. Bruen decision.

Activism

Hogg criticized the media coverage of the Parkland shooting as well as its aftermath in that black students were not given a voice by the media; he said that his school was 25% black but "the way we're covered doesn't reflect that".

In April 2018, Hogg initiated an effort to urge Speaker of the House Paul Ryan to bring a bill to the House of Representatives that required mandatory background checks for gun buyers; on Twitter, Hogg urged people to contact speaker Ryan and demand a vote on universal background checks.

Hogg worked to develop an anti-NRA advocacy group to encourage young people to register and vote in the 2018 midterm elections and elect candidates who promise better gun control legislation.

In May 2018, Hogg and other Never Again MSD students led a "die-in" protest at a Publix supermarket, with a mass of students lying down on the store's floor, as a rebuke of the supermarket's financial support of pro-NRA gubernatorial candidate Adam Putnam; the supermarket had contributed more than $670,000 to Putnam's campaign over three years. In addition, Hogg called on people to boycott Publix until the chain's support of Putnam stopped. As a result of the protest, Publix made a statement suspending support for Putnam.

In August 2018, Hogg announced he was planning on running to become a member of the United States House of Representatives when he turns 25 years old (due to age of candidacy laws).

On February 10, 2021, March For Our Lives announced that Hogg would take a leave of absence "to take some time for himself to reflect and recommit to the mission."

On July 20, 2022, Hogg interrupted a House Judiciary Committee hearing to mark up the 2021 Assault Weapons Ban and the Equal Access for Victims of Gun Violence Act. During Republican member Andy Biggs' time, Biggs said that Americans should be armed should an invasion of the southern border happen. Hogg then shouted: "The shooter at my high school: antisemitic, anti-black and racist. The shooter in El Paso described it as an invasion", in reference to the 2019 El Paso shooting. He added, as he was escorted out of the hearing room: "Those guns are coming from the United States of America. They aren't coming from Mexico. You are reiterating the points of a mass shooter sir".

Boycotts 

Hogg called for students to boycott spring break in Florida and instead travel to Puerto Rico if gun control legislation was not passed by the Florida state government. Having finished high school in May 2018, Hogg took a gap year to campaign for politicians in favor of gun reform in the midterm elections.

Hogg initiated a boycott of companies who advertise during The Ingraham Angle. Hogg called for the boycott after television host Laura Ingraham attacked him in a tweet about his lack of college acceptances, which Hogg characterized as cyberbullying. In response to the boycott, 24 advertisers left the show. Following the loss of advertisers, Ingraham apologized. Hogg dismissed the apology as insincere. The boycott drew mixed reactions. Ingraham was supported by Ted Nugent, Bill Maher, and by Russian bots on Twitter. Fox News continued to support Ingraham. Public polling showed that public perception of Fox News declined more than that of any advertiser. Simultaneously, Ingraham's viewership increased in the weeks following the boycott. Before, her viewership averaged 2.5 million. It jumped to 3 million when she returned after the boycott.

Conspiracy theories and harassment 

Shortly after the shooting, false claims appeared on social media claiming that the event never happened, and others accused Hogg and other students of being "crisis actors". After a series of televised interviews following the shooting, far-right figures and conspiracy theorists attacked Hogg in online media. Hogg's family received death threats from various conspiracy theorists, according to David's mother. Facebook, YouTube, and Instagram reported removing posts that attack the students or accuse them of being actors. The conspiracy theories about Hogg and other Parkland activists were named PolitiFact 2018 Lie of the Year.

In April 2018, Hogg was threatened by Sinclair Broadcast Group TV host Jamie Allman from station KDNL-TV in St. Louis, who wrote a tweet threatening to insert a hot poker in his anus. Following a boycott of advertisers initiated by Hogg on The Allman Report, Allman resigned and his show was canceled.

On the morning of June 5, 2018, Broward County Sheriff's Office received a false report from an anonymous caller claiming that there was a hostage situation in Hogg's family home. The harassment tactic known as swatting was described by Hogg, several media organizations, and the sheriff's department as a prank.

During a June 2019 interview with the Washington Post Magazine, Hogg said there have been seven attempts on his life.

In March 2019, now congresswoman Marjorie Taylor Greene followed Hogg down the street in Washington D.C. for over a minute demanding to know how he was able to get media coverage and meetings with over 30 U.S. lawmakers.  She called him a "coward" and then, on video, accused him of being paid by George Soros and others. Hogg later responded to Greene on Twitter, saying, "how embarrassing a sitting congresswoman argues that an 18 year old is both a more affective  lobbyist and communicator than her."

Business venture
In February 2021, Hogg announced that he and progressive tech entrepreneur William LeGate would start a company to compete with MyPillow, whose CEO Mike Lindell has spread unsubstantiated claims of voter fraud as a staunch supporter of former President Trump. Hogg announced the new venture in a series of tweets. The company name was later announced as Good Pillow. In early April 2021, Hogg announced in another series of tweets that he had resigned, released all his interest in the company to LeGate, and was leaving the venture.

Publications 
 
 The March for Our Lives Founders (2018). Glimmer of Hope: How Tragedy Sparked a Movement (contributor). Razorbill. .

References

External links

 
 
 
 On the Bill Maher show YouTube video
 Interview with Hogg and Gonzalez by CBS News

2000 births
21st-century American journalists
21st-century American writers
Activists from California
American activist journalists
American bloggers
American businesspeople
American child activists
American gun control activists
American male bloggers
American male journalists
American newspaper writers
American political writers
American shooting survivors
American YouTubers
Articles containing video clips
Crime witnesses
Gun politics in the United States
Journalists from California
Journalists from Florida
Living people
People from Los Angeles
People from Parkland, Florida
People with dyslexia
People with post-traumatic stress disorder
Place of birth missing (living people)
Stoneman Douglas High School shooting activists
Video bloggers
Writers from California
Writers from Florida
Writers from Los Angeles